Hepatoerythropoietic porphyria is a very rare form of hepatic porphyria caused by a disorder in both genes which code Uroporphyrinogen III decarboxylase (UROD).

It has a similar presentation to porphyria cutanea tarda (PCT), but with earlier onset. In classifications which define PCT type 1 as "sporadic" and PCT type 2 as "familial", hepatoerythropoietic porphyria is more similar to type 2.

See also 
 Hereditary coproporphyria
 List of cutaneous conditions
 List of dental abnormalities associated with cutaneous conditions

References

External links 

 
 

Porphyrias
Skin conditions resulting from errors in metabolism